Seneca Falls Village Historic District is a national historic district located at Seneca Falls in Seneca County, New York.  The district contains 174 principal contributing buildings including 14 contributing outbuildings, 8 contributing structures, 2 contributing objects, and 40 principal contributing buildings.  The majority of the buildings are residential or commercial and located north of the New York State Barge Canal.  The district encompasses a collection of brick and frame buildings exhibiting a range of mid- to late-19th century and early 20th-century architectural styles.  A notable industrial site is the former Seneca Knitting Mills complex.

It was listed on the National Register of Historic Places in 1991.

References

Historic districts on the National Register of Historic Places in New York (state)
Historic districts in Seneca County, New York
National Register of Historic Places in Seneca County, New York
Village Historic District